Jean-Baptiste Weyler (1749-1791) was a French miniaturist.

One of his pupils is thought to have been Aglaé Cadet, mother of Weyler's wife Henriette-Thérèse Cadet

References

1749 births
1791 deaths